Ellen Lawless Ternan (3 March 1839 – 25 April 1914), also known as Nelly Ternan or Nelly Wharton-Robinson, was an English actress known for association with the author Charles Dickens.

Birth and family life 
Ellen Ternan was born in Rochester, Kent. She was the third of four children; she had a brother who died in infancy and two sisters named Maria and Frances (later the second wife of Thomas Adolphus Trollope, the brother of Anthony Trollope).  Her parents, Thomas Lawless Ternan and Frances Eleanor Ternan (née Jarman), were both actors of some distinction.

Theatre 
Ternan made her stage debut in Sheffield at the age of three, and she and her two sisters were presented as "infant phenomena". Ellen was considered the least theatrically gifted of the three sisters, but she worked extensively in the provinces, particularly after her father died in October 1846 in the Bethnal Green Insane Asylum.

In 1857, she was spotted by Charles Dickens performing at London's Haymarket Theatre. He cast her, on the recommendation of his friend, actor and playwright Alfred Wigan, along with her mother and sister Maria, in three performances of The Frozen Deep by Wilkie Collins in Manchester in August 1857. It was not unusual for professional actresses to be invited to appear with amateur gentlemen; Mrs Ternan played a Scottish nurse; Maria, the heroine Clara; and  Nelly (Ellen) took over the girl's part from Katey Dickens, Dickens's seventeen-year-old daughter.

Association with Charles Dickens 
In mid-September 1857, Charles Dickens went with Wilkie Collins to Doncaster to see Ellen perform in The Pet of the Petticoats at the Theatre Royal, and wrote to John Forster that his relationship with his wife was disintegrating; 'Poor Catherine and I are not made for each other [-] What is now befalling I have seen steadily coming'.

Dickens was 45 years old when he met Ellen Ternan.  She was 18 at the time, only slightly older than his daughter Katey. It is believed that Dickens began an affair with Ternan; however, the true nature of their relationship was kept secret from the general public.  Ternan was clever, charming, a force of character, and interested in literature and the theatre. Dickens referred to Ternan as his "magic circle of one."  According to what is known, matters came to a head in 1858 when Catherine Dickens opened a packet delivered by a London jeweller which contained a gold bracelet meant for Ternan, with a note written by her husband. Charles and Catherine Dickens separated that May, after 22 years of marriage.

Ternan left the stage in 1860, and was financially supported by Dickens from that point onward.  She sometimes travelled with him, which was the case in the event of the Staplehurst rail crash in Kent on 9 June 1865 as Dickens was travelling with Ternan and her mother back from a visit to France.  Allegedly, he abandoned a plan to take her on his visit to America in 1867 for fear that their relationship would be publicized by the American press.  She lived in houses he took under false names at Slough in Berkshire and later at Nunhead in Southwark. Although the truth of the issue has been highly speculated, Ternan may have given birth to a son by Dickens who died in infancy.  There is little evidence pertaining to the nature of Charles Dickens and Ellen Ternan's relationship because neither Dickens, Ternan, nor Ternan's sisters left any account of the relationship, and most correspondence relevant to the relationship was destroyed.  Dickens is thought by many scholars and commentators to have based several of his female characters on Ternan, including Estella in Great Expectations, Bella Wilfer in Our Mutual Friend and Helena Landless in The Mystery of Edwin Drood, and others may have been inspired by her, particularly Lucie Manette in A Tale of Two Cities.   Dickens left a legacy of £1,000 to Ternan in his will on his death in 1870, and sufficient income from a trust fund to ensure that she would never have to work again.

Later life and marriage 
In 1876, six years after Dickens's death, Ternan married George Wharton Robinson, an Oxford graduate, who was 12 years her junior and knew nothing of her close association with Dickens. She presented herself as 14 years younger (23 years old, rather than 37). The couple had a son, Geoffrey, and a daughter, Gladys, and ran a boys' school in Margate. Ternan's husband died in 1910, and she spent her last years in Southsea with her sister Frances. She died of cancer in Fulham, London on April 25, 1914, and is buried in Highland Road Cemetery in Portsmouth, the city of Dickens's birth.

Speculation and research 
The Dickens Fellowship and the surviving close family members of Charles Dickens maintained a facade of silence and denial about the affair from the time of Charles Dickens's death in 1870 until the death in December 1933 of his last surviving child, Sir Henry Fielding Dickens. Several Dickens researchers wrote about various aspects of the relationship between Ellen Ternan and Charles Dickens in the ensuing years, including Gladys Story in 1939, Ada Nisbet in 1952, Sir Felix Aylmer in 1959, and Katherine M Longley in 1985. Ellen Ternan was the subject of a bestselling biography by Claire Tomalin in 1990, which brought the relationship to a broader general audience. A summary of the story of the discovery of the relationship was published in 2012 by Professor Michael Slater.

Some records relating to Ellen Ternan and her family are held by Senate House Library, University of London.

Portrayal in theatre and television 

Simon Gray's play about her life, Little Nell, had its world premiere in 2007 at the Theatre Royal, Bath. It was directed by Sir Peter Hall and starred Louise Brealey as Ternan. The affair was featured in the docudramas Dickens (BBC, 2002) and Dickens' Secret Lovers (2008, Channel 4 – it was the main subject of this programme, presented by Charles Dance and with Ternan played by Amy Shiels and Dickens by David Haig). Ternan is also featured in the novel Drood by Dan Simmons.

Portrayal in film 
The Invisible Woman (2013) is a feature film adaptation of Tomalin's book about Ternan's relationship with Dickens. Ternan is played by Felicity Jones and Dickens by Ralph Fiennes. The 21-year age difference between the two actors is somewhat similar to the 27-year difference between Ternan and Dickens.

References 

Other sources
 .
 .
 .
 .
 .
 .

 Claire Tomalin, 'Ternan, Ellen Lawless (1839–1914)', Oxford Dictionary of National Biography, Oxford University Press, 2004; online edn, Jan 2008 accessed 8 Feb 2012
 .
Ellen Ternan at spartacus-educational.com

Charles Dickens
19th-century English actresses
Women of the Victorian era
People from Rochester, Kent
1839 births
1914 deaths
Actresses from Kent
Muses
Survivors of railway accidents or incidents